Nella città l'inferno (Behind Closed Shutters) is a 1959 Italian film directed by Renato Castellani.

Plot
When the wide-eyed Lina (Giulietta Masina) lands in a women's prison, she meets a world-weary prostitute named Egle (Anna Magnani) who looks out for her. After Egle teaches Lina what she knows and begins to harden the girl, Lina commits another crime on the outside and winds up back in jail, a shell of her former self. Egle, meanwhile, who had taken a genuine liking to Lina, has tried to better herself and is shocked to see what has become of her former protégé.

Cast 
Anna Magnani: Egle
Giulietta Masina: Lina
Myriam Bru: Vittorina 
Cristina Gajoni: Marietta Mugnari
Renato Salvatori: Piero
Alberto Sordi: Antonio Zampi, aka Adone
Angela Portaluri: Laura
Milly Monti: Sister Giuseppina
Maria Virginia Benati: Vera 
Marcella Rovena: Miss Luisa
Gina Rovere: Delia 
Miranda Campa:  Ida Maroni
Saro Urzì: Marshall 
Sergio Fantoni: Judge
Umberto Spadaro: Prison Director

External links 

1959 films
Italian black-and-white films
1950s Italian-language films
Films set in Italy
Films set in Rome
Films directed by Renato Castellani
Films with screenplays by Suso Cecchi d'Amico
1950s Italian films